Nehemias Ó CluainínOESA (Sometimes Anglicised to Nehamiah Clonin), was Bishop of Clogher from his appointment in 1502 until his resignation a year later.

References

16th-century Roman Catholic bishops in Ireland
Pre-Reformation bishops of Clogher
1505 deaths